Carmen Viance (June 21, 1905 – July, 1985) was a Spanish actress who appeared in twenty films between 1924 and 1943, including the 1927 silent film The Mendez Women.

Selected filmography
 Carnival Figures (1926)
 Valencian Rose (1926)
 The Mendez Women (1927)
 The Cursed Village (1930)
 Currito of the Cross (1936)
 The House of Rain (1943)

References

Further reading 
 Bentley, Bernard. A Companion to Spanish Cinema. Boydell & Brewer 2008.

External links 
 

1905 births
1985 deaths
Spanish film actresses
Spanish silent film actresses
Actresses from Madrid
20th-century Spanish actresses